The hoge vuurtoren van IJmuiden ("high lighthouse of IJmuiden") is a round, cast-iron lighthouse in IJmuiden, Netherlands, designed by Quirinus Harder. It was built in 1878 by D.A. Schretlen & Co, a company in Leiden.

Together with the Lage vuurtoren van IJmuiden, the 35-meter high lighthouse forms a pair of leading lights marking the IJgeul (the entrance on the North Sea to the North Sea Canal). The lighthouse has 159 steps; it is unmanned and not open for visitors.

See also

 List of lighthouses in the Netherlands
 Cast-iron architecture

Notes

IJmuiden
Lighthouses completed in 1878
Rijksmonuments in North Holland
Velsen